Talesh County (also  Tavalesh is in Gilan province, Iran. The capital of the county is the city of Hashtpar. At the 2006 census, the county's population was 179,499 in 42,949 households. The following census in 2011 counted 189,933 people in 52,989 households. At the 2016 census, the county's population was 200,649 in 61,055 households.

Administrative divisions

The population history of Talesh County's administrative divisions over three consecutive censuses is shown in the following table. The latest census shows four districts, ten rural districts, and five cities.

History 
The Talysh peoples are, as archaeological studies show, one of the oldest inhabitants of the western littoral Caspian Sea areas, which stretches from Dagestan in the north, to Iran in the south. The Talysh have lived in what are known as "Talysh land" for millennia, and are amongst the native inhabitants of what is today Iran and neighboring Azerbaijan. There is a belief amongst scholars,  as well as by the Talysh themselves who generally identify with the Cadusii, that the ancient Cadusii are the ancestor of the today's Talysh.

The lands of the Talesh were much larger than the present day area. In olden times the geographical areas of the Talysh people was more than 10,000 km2.  At present the Taleshan live in Gilan Province, and some cities in Ardabil Province (Iran) and southeastern Azarbaijan.

Historical monuments and natural sites 

Salsal village which goes back to Ismaeilieh era near Ghalehbin village located 15 km. from Talesh..
White Mosque which dates from Seljukian era that situated at Hashtpar (Talesh) city .
Agh-ev-lar region at a distance of 32 km of this city which is considered among the first grade tourist sites of the Iran.
Asalem - Khalkhal road, and Laezeh countryside on the way to Khalkhal .
Coasts of Kissom
Loomer Waterfall
Nasrollah Khan Sardar Amjad (Amidossaltaneh) Winter Quarters Castle - dates back to Qajar Era. It has eight sides.
Nasrolah Khan Sardar Amjad (Amidossaltaneh) Summer Quarters Castle - in Aq Evlar Village.
Three - Floor Tombs Around the Lighthouse (Atashkadeh), and Remnants of Mard Ali Bil.
Aq Evlar Old Bath - located in a garden of Merian Village, built in Safavid Era ( 500 years ago).
Soobatan countryside.

Geography
Talesh is located on the southwestern coast of the Caspian Sea. Talesh County, covering an area of 2373 square kilometers, is ¼ of surface area of Gilan Province.

Talesh County has inland scenic areas in the Alborz mountain range, with intact natural habitats that are places for appreciating nature.

Culture

Languages 

Generally speaking, the land of Talesh has been divided in three regions: Gaskarat (Masalli, Taskoh, Shanderman, Rezvashar, Hashtpar, Asalem, Astara); Foumanat (Fouman, Masoleh, and Shaft); and Azerbaijan Taloshian (Lankaran amongst others).  
In Gaskarat, the majority of people speak Taleshi and Farsi. In Foumanat, most speak Taleshi. Lastly, Talysh from neighboring Azerbaijan are often bilingual and trilingual, consisting of Taleshi, Azeri and Russian speakers.

Gilaki and Taleshi are rapidly losing ground in many cities of Tavalesh due to heavy immigration of people from Azerbaijan.

Ethnicities
Sir Arnold Wilson wrote:
"Iran's primary inhabitants generations still in Gilan in the forest areas near a sea (Caspian sea) could be found, these people by Aryan desert settled people expelled from their fatherland and this started 2000 years before Christ and lasted for centuries Sir Arnold Wilson was talking about Taleshian. Land of old Aran which from past till now was the house of Taleshan, was in fact the place that Aryans migration started from many researchers know Kadousian or the ancestors of Taleshian as the old natives of present Iran before the Aryan immigration. Present Taleshian beside other Iranians have a sense of proud of being Iranian and Aryan and are one of the little Iranian communities that kept their pure and Aryan culture."

Religion 
Talesh people at present are Sunni and Shia Muslims. Most of the southern and central Taleshian are Shia, and northern Taleshian are composed of both Shia and Sunni.

Agriculture 
Rice has been cultivated in this region for many years, where some indigenous cultivars (landrace) were conventionally bred by farmers.

References

External links
Gitashenasi.com: Provincal Atlas of Iran —  اطلس گیتاشناسی استان‌های ایران 
Livius.org: "Cadusians" − by Jona Lendering.

 

Counties of Gilan Province